The Stewkley (or Stukeley, or Stukely) Baronetcy, of Hinton in the County of Southampton, was a title in the Baronetage of England.  It was created on 9 June 1627 for Hugh Stewkley.  The title became extinct on the death of the second Baronet in 1719.

Stewkley baronets, of Hinton (1627)

Sir Hugh Stewkley, 1st Baronet ( – 1642)
Sir Hugh Stewkley, 2nd Baronet (died 1719)

References

Extinct baronetcies in the Baronetage of England
1627 establishments in England